KADU (90.1 FM) is a radio station licensed to Hibbing, Minnesota, United States.  The station is owned by Heartland Christian Broadcasters, Inc.

Translators
In addition to the main station, KADU is relayed by an additional translator to widen its broadcast area.

References

External links

Moody Radio affiliate stations
Radio stations established in 1985
1985 establishments in Minnesota
Christian radio stations in Minnesota